For Lack of a Better Name is the fourth studio album by Canadian electronic music producer Deadmau5. It was released on September 22, 2009 in the United States and Canada by Ultra Records and Mau5trap and internationally on 5 October 2009 by Virgin Records. The album features collaborations with MC Flipside ("Hi Friend!") and Rob Swire of Pendulum ("Ghosts 'n' Stuff"). The album also contains the critically acclaimed song "Strobe". It was deadmau5's first album to be released internationally on the Virgin Records label.

Track listing

Continuous mix version

The Extended Mixes

In popular culture 
A music video for "Ghosts 'n' Stuff" was released in August 2009. "Ghosts 'n' Stuff" was also featured on a promo for the Canadian edition of So You Think You Can Dance in 2010 and was in the 2020 music video game Fuser. The beginning of the song is also featured in a Chinese opusculum by Song Xiaobao. The songs "FML" and "Hi Friend!" are featured on an episode of Gossip Girl where deadmau5 appeared as himself. "Strobe" as well as the track "Cthulhu Sleeps" from his next album 4×4=12 also went on to appear in an episode of Epic Meal Time, in which deadmau5 also starred.

Charts

Weekly charts

Year-end charts

Certifications

References

External links 
 For Lack of a Better Name at Discogs

2009 albums
Deadmau5 albums
Mau5trap albums
Virgin Records albums
Ultra Records albums
EMI Records albums
Juno Award for Dance Recording of the Year recordings